Al-e Mahmudi (also Romanized as Āl-e Maḩmūdī; also known as Āl-e Maḩmūd) is a village in Rahdar Rural District, in the Central District of Rudan County, Hormozgan Province, Iran. At the 2006 census, its population was 58, in 12 families.

References 

Populated places in Rudan County